is a town located in Iwami District, Tottori Prefecture, Japan. , the town had an estimated population of 10,998 in 4429  households and a population density of 90 persons per km². Iwami lies entirely within the San'in Kaigan Geopark.

Geography

Located in eastern Tottori, Iwami faces the Sea of Japan to the north. The surrounding landscape is dominated by low-lying hills and slopes; much of the built town and residential areas are located in flatter land between the heights. The north of the town borders onto Uradome Beach, though much of the rest of the coast consists of rough rocky outcrops and small inlets and bays. 15 km of this, collectively known as the Uradome Coast, is part of the Sanin Kaigan National Park. The Gamō River runs through the centre of the town. Iwami is around 30 minutes by train from the prefectural capital of Tottori City, and is the third stop by train heading east on the Tottori-Hamasaka line. Hyōgo Prefecture and Iwami's sister town of Shin'onsen are relatively nearby as well.

Weather in Iwami can be quite changeable, with summer temperatures peaking at over 30 degrees Celsius in August and dropping as low as -2 degrees in January and February. Whilst relatively tectonically stable for Japan, the area is prone to the occasional typhoon during the season.

Neighbouring municipalities 
Tottori Prefecture
Tottori
Hyōgo Prefecture
 Shin'onsen

Climate
Iwami has a Humid climate (Köppen Cfa) characterized by warm, wet summers and cold winters with heavy snowfall.

Demographics
Per Japanese census data, the population of Iwami has been decreased steadily since the 1950s.

History 
The area of Iwami was part of ancient Inaba Province. During the Edo period, the area was part of the holdings of Tottori Domain ruled by a branch of the Ikeda clan from their seat at Tottori Castle.  Iwami District, Tottori was established after the Meiji restoration and divided into several villages with the creation of the modern municipalities system on April 1,1896. The town of Iwami was established on July 1, 1954 by the merger of two towns (Uradome and Iwai) and seven villages.

Government
Iwami has a mayor-council form of government with a directly elected mayor and a unicameral town council of twelve members. Iwami contributes one member to the Tottori Prefectural Assembly. In terms of national politics, the town is part of Tottori 1st district of the lower house of the Diet of Japan.

Economy 

The majority of the town's working population is connected with the commercial fishing industry, notably squid fishing boats or aquaculture. Agriculture is also important, with the most common crop being rice. Iwami also has a locally renowned onsen (hot spring), the Iwai onsen.

Education
Iwami has three public elementary schools and one  junior high school operated by the town government, and one public high school operated by the Tottori Prefectural Board of Education.

Transportation

Railway 
 JR West - San'in Main Line
  -  -

Highways 
  San'in Kinki Expressway

Local attractions
Uradome Coast, National Place of Scenic Beauty
Iwami Onsen
Iwai temple ruins, National Historic Site

Culture
Iwami served as the model for the fictional town of Iwatobi, the setting for the anime series Free!. Iwami has used the series to promote tourism to the town.

Noted people from Iwami
Komakichi Matsuoka, politician

References

External links

 Iwami official website 

Towns in Tottori Prefecture
Populated coastal places in Japan
Iwami, Tottori